Eyes Wide Open may refer to:

 Eyes Wide Open (exhibit), an exhibit in memory of the American soldiers of the Iraq War
 Eyes Wide Open (film), a 2009 Israeli film
 "Eyes Wide Open" (Gotye song), 2010
 "Eyes Wide Open" (Staind song), 2012
 Eyes Wide Open (Middle episode), an episode of the 9th season of The Middle
 "Eyes Wide Open", a 2012 song by Serbian-Australian DJ, Dirty South
 "Eyes Wide Open", a 1999 memoir by Frederic Raphael about his collaboration with Stanley Kubrick on the film Eyes Wide Shut
 Eyes Wide Open (Davíd Garza album), 1992 album by Davíd Garza
 Eyes Wide Open (Sabrina Carpenter album), 2015 
 "Eyes Wide Open" (Sabrina Carpenter song), 2015
 Eyes Wide Open (Klear album), 2015
 Eyes Wide Open (King Crimson album), 2003
 Eyes Wide Open: Going Behind the Environmental Headlines, a book written by Paul Fleischman, published in 2014
 Eyes Wide Open (Twice album), 2020
 "Eyes Wide Open", a song by Jars of Clay from The Shelter, 2010
 "Eyes Wide Open", a song by Sara Groves from Fireflies and Songs'', 2009

See also
 Eyes Wide Shut (disambiguation)